Rębiszów  is a village in the administrative district of Gmina Mirsk, within Lwówek Śląski County, Lower Silesian Voivodeship, in south-western Poland, close to the Czech border.

The village has a population of 700.

There are two historic churches in Rębiszów: the Church of the Visitation, which dates back to the 16th century and the Saint Barbara church from the 18th century. There is also a train station in the village.

History 

The name of the village comes from the Polish word rąbać ("chop"), referring to chopping trees. Its oldest form was Rąbyn. In the Liber fundationis episcopatus Vratislaviensis from around 1300 the village was mentioned under the Latinized name Rabysow.

Later on, the village was also part of Bohemia (Czechia), Prussia and Germany. During World War II, the Germans created and operated the E232 forced labour subcamp of the Stalag VIII-B/344 prisoner-of-war camp at the local quarry. English, Yugoslav and French prisoners of war were held there. In the final stages of World War II, in January-February 1945, in the Rębiszów forest, the Germans carried out executions of forced laborers and prisoners of war, who were caught trying to escape from German labor camps.

Sports
The local football club is Skalnik Rębiszów. It competes in the lower leagues.

References

Villages in Lwówek Śląski County
Nazi war crimes in Poland